Exeter Cathedral School (ECS) is a 3–13 mixed, Church of England, private day and boarding choir and preparatory school in Exeter, Devon, England. It has been closely associated with Exeter Cathedral since it was first recorded as existing in the 12th century.

History 
The exact date of the founding of the cathedral school is not known, but it has been educating choristers since 1179. In the 12th century, Exeter was regarded as an important centre of learning, and canon law was also taught at the cathedral.

For centuries, the school was provided by the Dean and Chapter to educate and house about twenty-six boy choristers who sang the cathedral's daily services, including Sung Eucharist and Choral Evensong.

Musical training was given to the choristers by the cathedral's organist and the master of choristers. Although these offices could be held by the same person, from the 17th century on they were usually carried out by two different men. In 1609, Edward Gibbons, a brother of Orlando Gibbons, was hired to teach the choristers instrumental music. In 1662, William Wake was being paid £20 a year to teach the choristers and secondaries  composing, singing, and the playing of the viol and the violin, and at the request of Charles II was given a leave of absence to carry out the same duties for the Chapel Royal.
 
The school's present main building, known as the Chantry, was built in 1870.

In the 1960s, the Dean and Chapter began to enlarge the school, offering places to boys other than the cathedral choristers. In 1994, a girls' choir was established in the cathedral, and the school became co-educational. By 2008, the families of the choristers were having to pay for their education, but there were eighteen choral scholarships, worth up to one quarter of the school fees.

In 2014, the school became independent of the Dean and Chapter, when it was established as an institution with its own governance and separate finances.

In 2017, two thirds of school-leavers were offered scholarships, exhibitions, or other awards by senior schools. The school was assessed by the Independent Schools Inspectorate in May 2019 and judged to be 'excellent' in all areas. By 2020, the school was educating about 275 children, offering a broad education rooted in Christian values. It is a member of the Choir Schools' Association.

Notable former pupils 
 Matthew Locke, composer
George Baker, organist
 Joseph Kemp, organist
 William Spark, musician and composer 
 Samuel Knight, architect
 Albert Moulton Foweraker, painter 
 Geoffrey Mitchell, conductor
 Tony Hymas, musician and composer 
 Piers Dudgeon, biographer 
 Harry Williamson, musician
 Andrew Nethsingha, Director of Music at St John's College, Cambridge
 Chris Martin, singer
 Adam Gibbons, known as Lack of Afro, musician 
 David Webb, of the English National Opera
 Pat McCormick, clergyman and sportsman

Notable staff 
 Richard Langdon, organist
 Jackson of Exeter, Master of Choristers 1777 to 1800

References

Further reading 
 Nicholas Orme, "Education and Learning at a Medieval English Cathedral: Exeter, 1380–1548" in Journal of Ecclesiastical History 32 (1981)

External links 

 
 Exeter Cathedral School - Chorister Memories at YouTube
 Exeter Cathedral School - Sport and Wellbeing at YouTube
 Tagged articles at The Exeter Daily

Schools in Exeter
Church of England private schools in the Diocese of Exeter
Choir schools in England
Boarding schools in Devon
Preparatory schools in Devon
Educational institutions established in the 12th century
12th-century establishments in England